Gauriganj is a city, tehsil and administrative headquarters of Amethi district in Faizabad division, Uttar Pradesh, India. It is situated about 126 km from Lucknow, the capital of Uttar Pradesh. It is located in Eastern Uttar Pradesh. Before July 2010, Gauriganj was part of Sultanpur district and then taking Gauriganj, Amethi, Jais, Jagdispur and Salon, formed a new district called Chatrapati Sahuji Maharaj Nagar, later named Gauriganj and now Amethi. Gauriganj is connected with State Highway 34 and National Highway 128.

Etymology
Gauriganj is named after goddess Gauri.

History
At the turn of the 20th century, Gauriganj was described as "a rising town, with a station on the Oudh and Rohilkhand Railway." It then technically consisted of two villages, Katra-Lalganj and Madhopur. The bazar was founded by Madho Singh, the Raja of Amethi (d.1891). Gauriganj then hosted a rising grain market and had a pound, police station, and post office, as well as an upper primary school, which had many students from both Gauriganj itself and the surrounding countryside; it had a small building, though, which was not big enough to accommodate the student body adequately. The town was then surrounded by several deep hollows. West of Katra-Lalganj were low-lying fields where only jarhan rice was grown. The population of Gauriganj as of 1901 was 2,543, including a large Bania community which was larger than any other town in the district except Sultanpur. There was a Muslim minority of 194, and the rest of the town's population was a mix of Ahirs, Kurmis, and Gadariyas, as well as some Pasis.

Geography

Climate 
Gauriganj has a warm subtropical climate with very cold and dry winters from December to mid-February, and dry, hot summers from April to mid-June. During extreme winters, the maximum temperature is around 12 degrees Celsius and the minimum is around 3 to 4 degrees Celsius. Fog is quite common from late December to late January. Summers can be quite hot with temperatures rising to 40 to 45 degrees Celsius.

Gauriganj has a tropical wet and dry climate with average temperatures ranging between 20 and 28 °C (68 to 82 °F). Gauriganj experiences three distinct seasons: summer, monsoon and a mild autumn. Typical summer months are from March to May, with maximum temperatures ranging from 30 to 45 °C (86 to 100 °F). Although summer doesn't end until May, the city often receives heavy thundershowers in May, and humidity remains high. The rainy season is from mid-June to mid-September, when it gets an average rainfall of 722 mm, mostly from the south-west monsoon winds. Even during the hottest months, the nights are usually cool due to Gauriganj's altitude. The highest temperature ever recorded was 48.3 °C (118.9 °F). The monsoon lasts from June to October, with moderate rainfall and temperatures ranging from 10 to 28 °C (50 to 82 °F). Autumn begins in November. The daytime temperature hovers around 28 °C (82 °F) while the night temperature is below 10 °C (50 °F) for most of December and January, often dropping to 3 to 4 °C (37 to 39 °F).

Demographics
As of 2011 Indian Census, Gauriganj tehsil had a total population of 390,935, of which 196,844 were males and 194,091 were females. Population within the age group of 0 to 6 years was 59,192. The total number of literates in Gauriganj was 214,282, which constituted 54.8% of the population with male literacy of 60.1% and female literacy of 45.4%. The effective literacy rate of 7+ population of Gauriganj was 64.6%, of which male literacy rate was 75.9% and female literacy rate was 53.3%. The Scheduled Castes and Scheduled Tribes population was 108,841 and 86 respectively. Gauriganj had 67,832 households in 2011.

The 1961 census recorded Gauriganj as having a population of 1,883 people (1,038 male and 845 female), in 468 households and 456 physical houses..

Languages and religion 

Hindi and Urdu are the official languages. Awadhi is also widely spoken along with English.

Hinduism is followed by large numbers of the population. A significant part of the population of the city consists of followers of Islam and Sikhism. Christians and Jains constitute a minority of the population.

Governemnt and politics

Civic administration
Gauriganj had a police force of 2 sub-inspectors, 1 head constable, and 13 constables.

Amenities
Gauriganj has a post office, a railway station, a library, and a government-run dispensary with 4 male and 2 female beds, as well as a maternity and child welfare centre and a family planning centre.

Economy
Gauriganj hosts a grain market on Mondays and Fridays, with an average attendance of about 2,000 at the time of the 1961 census.

Cityscape / Culture
Durga Puja is celebrated in Gauriganj with cultural activities from the 8th day of Navratri for 14 days. Moorty Visarjan is also a big event as it takes approximately 90 hours to complete with thousands of indulged people. Krishna Janmashtami is also celebrated with great joy. In Some Aashram (likes: Baba Balak Das etc.) and some temples (e.g. Doodh Nath Mandir, Ram Janki Mandir, Hanuman Mandir) Feast (i.e. Vishal Bhog Bhandara) took places annually.

Eid-ul-Fitr, Eid-ul-Adha, Eid Milad-un-Nabi and Shab-e-Barat are also celebrated in Gauriganj.

Places of interest
 Nandmahar Dham
 Lodi Baba Mandir
 Durgan Dham Temple
 Mata Mawai Dham
 Ulta Gadha Dham

Education
The 1951 census recorded Gauriganj as having a district board-run primary school, with 201 students in attendance as of 1 January of the year.

Villages
Gauriganj CD block has the following 102 villages:

Notable people

 Manoj Muntashir is an Indian lyricist, poet and screenwriter was born in this town.
 Rakesh Pandey Writer and author
 Jagdish Piyush, Journalist, writer, author and leader
 Deepak Singh, politician and member of Uttar Pradesh Legislative Council

Gallery

References

Cities and towns in Amethi district

pl:Gauriganj